Silvia Beatriz Guazzini Monsalve (born December 22, 1953 in Santiago), best known as Coca Guazzini, is a Chilean television, theatre and film actress. Guazzini studied theatre at Universidad de Chile. She appeared in some popular Chilean telenovelas like Sucupira, Aquelarre and Tic-Tac. In 2002 Coca Guazzini won the Apes Award for "Best Actress".

One of her most recognized roles is Pía Correa Gumucio, of the comedy show Los Eguiguren.

Filmography

Films
 1990, Viva el Novio.
 2004, La Sagrada Familia as Soledad.
 2004, De Película.
 2005, Padre Nuestro.
 2005, Play as Laura.
 2006, Rojo, la película as Susana.
 2007, Normal con Alas
 2013, Gloria
 2016, Rara as Icha.

TV shows
 1982, Sábado Gigante as Pía Correa Gumucio.
 1992, Jaguar Yu

References

External links
 

1953 births
Actresses from Santiago
Chilean stage actresses
Chilean film actresses
Chilean television actresses
Chilean telenovela actresses
Chilean women comedians
Chilean people of Italian descent
Living people
University of Chile alumni